is a district located in central Kanagawa Prefecture, Japan. It currently consists of only one town, Samukawa. The entire cities of Chigasaki, Fujisawa, Yamato, Ayase, Ebina, Zama; and parts of the city of Sagamihara, were formerly part of Kōza District.

As of 2009, the district has an estimated population of 47,812 and a density of 3,560 persons per km2. The total area is 13.42 km2.

Towns and villages 
Samukawa

History 

Kōza District was one of the ancient subdivisions of Sagami Province, extending from Sagami Bay north to the border of Musashi Province between the Sagami River and the Sakai River. The provincial capital of Sagami Province and its kokubunji were located within Kōza District, although its exact location is today unknown.

The area was under the control of various shōen from the Heian period through the Sengoku period, and was held as tenryō territory administered by the shōgun under the Tokugawa shogunate of the Edo period.

Timeline
After the Meiji Restoration, it was established as a district under the cadastral reform of 1878, with a district office built near what is now part of Chigasaki. This was moved to Fujisawa-Ōsaka Town (present-day Fujisawa) in 1906.

 On April 1, 1889, Kōza District was divided into one town (Fujisawa-Ōsaka) and 22 villages. In 1908, Chigasaki Village became a town, as did Kamimizo in 1928, and Zama in 1937. Fujisawa became a city in 1940. Samukawa and Ebina became towns the same year. In 1941, Zama, Kamimizo and six neighboring villages merged to form the town of Sagamihara. Yamato became a town in 1943, Shibuya in 1944 and Ayase in 1945. Chigasaki became a city in 1947.
 In 1948, Zama was separated from Sagamihara, which became a city in 1954.
 The town of Shibuya dissolved in 1955, with the southern portions merging with Fujisawa, and the northern portion reverting to the status of village until absorbed by Yamato town in 1956. Yamato became a city in 1959, and both Ebina and Zama became cities in 1971, and Ayase in 1978, leaving Samukawa as the only remaining component of Kōza District.

Merger table

Districts in Kanagawa Prefecture